The Southern Connecticut Conference (SCC) is a high school athletics conference in Connecticut. The conference comprises schools located along the Long Island Sound.  The SCC is composed of 22 high schools, representing 16 communities, with over 23,000 students.

History 

In 1998, Career High School of New Haven joined the conference and was placed in the Housatonic Division.  In 2004, the league again expanded when the Board of Governors voted to accept two Milford-based schools, Foran and Jonathan Law.  Also in 2004, Bill O'Brien stepped down after serving 10 years as SCC Commissioner.  He was replaced by Al Carbone.  The SCC, having expanded to 23 member schools, decided to realign its divisional format for the 2004/2005 academic year.  The league added a fourth division, Oronoque, also named after a Native American river in Southern Connecticut.  The SCC also decided to realign its football-playing schools, primarily based on student enrollment. In 2009, Derby left the SCC to join the Naugatuck Valley League leaving the league with 22 member schools.

Membership

Hammonasset Division

Housatonic Division

Oronoque Division

Quinnipiac Division

Former members

Sports 

SCC member schools participate in the following 20 sports throughout the academic year.

Fall

Cross Country
Field Hockey
Football 
Soccer
Swimming (Women)
Volleyball (Women)

Winter

Basketball
Cheerleading
Gymnastics
Ice Hockey
Indoor Track
Swimming (Men)
Wrestling

Spring

Baseball
Golf
Lacrosse
Softball 
Tennis
Track and Field
Volleyball (Men)

References

External links 
Official website

Education in Connecticut
High school sports conferences and leagues in the United States
Sports in Connecticut